Seth Dunbar is an Australian canoe sailor.

Dunbar came third at the 2008 Canoe Sailing World Championships in the international canoes event by finishing behind American Bill Beaver and fellow Australian Hayden Virtue who was crowned as the new World Champion. Together with Virtue and Tim Wilson he also won the International Canoe Challenge Cup by successfully challenging the current holders Great Britain, represented by Colin Brown, John Robson and Simon Allen.

Career highlights 

 2008
 Port Phillip Bay,  3rd, World Championships Canoe Sailing, International Canoe
 Port Phillip Bay, winner, International Canoe Challenge Cup

External links 
 International Canoe Worlds at Port Phillip Bay, Victoria
 Australia have won the International Canoe Challenge Cup

Living people
Australian male sailors (sport)
Australian male canoeists
Year of birth missing (living people)